Saúl Mendoza (born 31 December 1964) is a Bolivian fencer. He competed in the individual foil and épée events at the 1984 Summer Olympics.

References

External links
 

1964 births
Living people
Bolivian male épée fencers
Olympic fencers of Bolivia
Fencers at the 1984 Summer Olympics
Bolivian male foil fencers